Eduard "Edi" Martini (born 2 January 1975) is an Albanian football manager and former player, who is the current head coach of Teuta in the Kategoria Superiore.

Playing career

Club
During his playing career, Martini represented mostly Vllaznia Shkodër but also played abroad with Slovenian Vevce, Austrian SAK Klagenfurt and Eintracht Frankfurt in Germany. He fled war-torn Albania for Germany in 1997 after a match in Spain along with teammate Adrian Dashi.

International
Martini made his international debut for Albania on 14 May 1994 during the 5–1 away defeat to Macedonia, appearing as a first-half substitute for Gentian Stojku. A year later, on 16 August 1995, he made his second appearance in a 2–1 upset to Malta, playing full-90 minutes.

Managerial career

Vllaznia Shkodër
On 29 December 2009, Martini was named as the new manager of his boyhood club Vllaznia Shkodër, and started the work with the team on 4 January 2010. He remained in the duty until the end of 2009–10 campaign, with Vllaznia Shkodër who missed the European competitions for only four points and was runner-up in Albanian Cup, losing in the final to Besa Kavajë.

Teuta Durrës
On 9 June 2010, Martini become the new coach of fellow Albanian Superliga side Teuta Durrës, signing a contract until the end of the season, taking the duty over Ylli Shehu. During the season, Teuta Durrës struggled to find results and finished league in 7th place, tied with Kastrioti Krujë and Shkumbini Peqin with 42 points. In 2010–11 Albanian Cup, Teuta didn't go more than the second round, where they were eliminated by Skënderbeu Korçë 2–0 on aggregate. Following the end of the season, Martini left the team after the club's president Edmond Hasanbelli decided not to extend his contract for the next season.

Luftëtari Gjirokastër
On 30 October 2012, Martini was appointed as head coach at Luftëtari Gjirokastër.

International statistics

References

External links
 Edi Martini at eintracht-archiv.de 
 Stats from Slovenia at PrvaLiga
 

1975 births
Living people
Footballers from Shkodër
Albanian footballers
Albania international footballers
Association football midfielders
KF Vllaznia Shkodër players
NK Slavija Vevče players
Eintracht Frankfurt players
Eintracht Frankfurt II players
Luftëtari Gjirokastër players
Besëlidhja Lezhë players
KF Apolonia Fier players
Kategoria Superiore players
Kategoria e Parë players
Albanian expatriate footballers
Albanian expatriate sportspeople in Slovenia
Albanian expatriate sportspeople in Austria
Albanian expatriate sportspeople in Germany
Expatriate footballers in Slovenia
Expatriate footballers in Austria
Expatriate footballers in Germany
Luftëtari Gjirokastër managers
KF Laçi managers
KF Vllaznia Shkodër managers
KF Teuta Durrës managers
Kategoria Superiore managers
Albanian football managers